Ilula is a town and ward in Kilolo District in the Iringa Region of Tanzania.  The Ilula Hospital is located in the town. It is operated by a faith-based organization.

In 2016 the Tanzania National Bureau of Statistics report there were 11,624 people in the ward, from 11,109 in 2012.

Notes

Wards of Iringa Region